ATV is a television station in Melbourne, Australia, part of Network 10 – one of the three major Australian free-to-air commercial television networks. The station is owned by Paramount Networks UK & Australia.

History

In April 1963, the licence to operate Melbourne's third commercial television station was awarded to Austarama Television, owned by transport magnate Reginald Ansett. The new channel, ATV-0 (pronounced as the letter O, never the number zero), began transmission on 1 August 1964 from a large modern studio complex located in the then-outer eastern suburb of Nunawading,
in the locality now known as Forest Hill, but referred to at the time as Burwood East.

The new station opened with a preview program hosted by Barry McQueen and Nancy Cato followed by a variety program, This Is It!.  Reception difficulties in parts of the city resulted in the station's virtually permanent third position in the Melbourne television ratings.

In 1964, under Reg Ansett, ATV-0 opened their studios in Nunawading, which was at the time the first purpose-built commercial television station in Melbourne. It was also the studio where the first ever colour broadcast in Australia would be filmed, leading to its consideration for heritage status in 2018.

ATV-0 had been experimenting with colour transmissions from 1967, when the station was the first to mount a colour outside broadcast in Australia, from the Pakenham races. Many other colour test transmissions occurred subsequently. Full-time colour transmission was introduced to ATV-0 in March 1975 in line with other stations around the country.

Rupert Murdoch gained a controlling interest in Sydney television station TEN-10 in 1979 and had bought a controlling stake in transport company Ansett, owner of Austarama Television (licensee of ATV-0). That triggered a government inquiry into media ownership, the main concern being Murdoch having a controlling interest in television stations in Australia's two largest cities, ignoring the fact that the Kerry Packer-owned Australian Consolidated Press had controlled the Nine Network channels in Melbourne and Sydney for many years.

Due to problems in reception and falling ratings, and the desire to move TV stations out of the VHF band so as to enable FM radio in Australia, the station moved frequency and call-sign from ATV-0 to ATV-10, after getting the agreement of neighbouring Gippsland station GLV-10 to change its frequency to become GLV-8.

On 20 January 1980, the revamped ATV-10 was launched with a jingle campaign ("You're on Top With Ten"), Graham Kennedy's introductory presentation and 10's Summer Sunday, a 3-hour live outside broadcast from Torquay Beach. Later in the evening,  You're On Top With Ten with Kennedy provided a preview of upcoming shows on the new channel, followed by the movie-length pilot for new drama series Arcade.

On 11 February 1980, Eyewitness News was relaunched with David Johnston and Jana Wendt as chief newsreaders. By May, Eyewitness News went back to its former one-hour duration, claiming that it was "First in Melbourne" due to its many innovations and historic moments and the fact that in the 1970s ATV was the first of the now "Network Ten" stations to adopt the Eyewitness News brand  and the one-hour newscast(with the first 1-hour newscast debuting in November 1975). Wendt left the channel in 1981 with Charles Slade replacing her and was later replaced by Jo Pearson, who served till 1988, joined by Mal Walden in 1987 and by the next year by Tracey Curro.

By the end of 1981, Murdoch had finally received approval for control of ATV-10.

The 1986 transfer of Neighbours to the Ten Network (from the Seven Network) proved to be a success. Aside from its use of suburban locations in Melbourne itself, ATV-10's Nunawading studios were used to produce the program.

On 7 September 1992, ATV-10 relocated from the station's famous Nunawading studios to the Como Centre in inner suburban South Yarra. The Nunawading complex is now operated by Fremantle Media, while the Como Centre studios in South Yarra are used for The Project as well as news, current affairs, entertainment and sport programs.

In 2004, Network 10 finished second nationally, and in  ATV-10's Melbourne region, only behind the dominant Nine Network.

On 10 December 2013, at 9:00:01am ATV-10 became one of the last stations in Australia to switch off its analog TV signal being the last Network 10 station and 4th last in the whole country of Australia to convert to digital-only transmission, the switch was flicked by Bob Rosenthal a retired ATV-10 engineer who 33 years earlier was there to switch ATV-0 over to ATV-10. Months after the switch the channel, together with the network, marked its golden jubilee anniversary.

Morning television
Local mid-morning programming from 1967 included Morning Magazine, Roundabout, The Roy Hampson Show, In Melbourne Today, Everyday (1979-1980) and Good Morning Melbourne (1981-1988) - the latter replaced by the Sydney-based Til Ten (1989-1991).  In 1992, ATV-10 produced The Morning Show for the Network Ten, hosted by Bert Newton.  The program was re-titled Good Morning Australia in 1993. GMA stayed on air until December 2005 and the following month was replaced by 9am with David & Kim hosted by Kim Watkins and David Reyne. The show had four years on air and in 2010 was replaced by The Circle hosted by Gorgi Coghlan, Yumi Stynes, Chrissie Swan and Denise Drysdale.

In 2012, after 40 years of producing morning television, the Ten Network made the decision to stop production on The Circle in favour of providing extra funds for its low-rating Breakfast program produced out of Sydney, and hosted by Paul Henry which was itself axed at the end of the year. In November 2013 the Network launched breakfast show Wake Up which was broadcast live from both Sydney and Melbourne and hosted by Natarsha Belling and James Mathison with News Updates presented by Nuala Hafner live from a glass studio at Melbourne's Federation Square. The show was later axed in May 2014 due to cost-cutting measures.

Digital multiplex

Programming

Locally produced programs by or with ATV-10 Melbourne.

Current productions at ATV Studios, South Yarra
 10 News First (Melbourne edition) (1964–present)
 The Project (2009–present)
 The Sunday Project (2017–present, shared with Sydney studios)
 Have You Been Paying Attention? (2013–present)
 The Cheap Seats (2021–present)
 Kinne Tonight (2019–present)
 Melbourne Cup coverage (1978–2001, 2019–present)

Past productions at ATV Studios
2020s
 10 News First Breakfast (Thursdays and Fridays only, 2022)
2010s
 MotoGP coverage (2015–2018)
 Rugby  coverage (2017–2019)
 Women's Big Bash League coverage (2015–2017)
 Big Bash League coverage (2013–2017)
 The Thursday Night Sport Show (2014)
 50 Years Young (2014)
 Glasgow Commonwealth Games Live Coverage (2014)
 Sochi Winter Olympics Live Coverage (2014)
 This Week Live (2013)
 Meet the Press (2012) Production moved to Sydney
 The Bolt Report (2011–2015)
 The Circle (2010–2012)
2000s
 The Game Plan (AFL) (2011–2012) (via One) (2009–2011)
 One Week at a Time (via One) (2009–2011)
 ANZ Championship Netball coverage (2008–2012, 2015–2016)
 9am with David and Kim (2006–2009)
 Before the Game (2003–2013)
 AFL (2002–2011)
 10 News First (Adelaide edition) (2000–2011, 2020–2023)
1990s
 The Panel  (1998–2004)
 Hinch (1992–1993)
 Good Morning Australia as GMA with Bert Newton (1992–2005)
1980s
 Family Double Dare (1989)
 Double Dare (1989–1992)
 Ten Morning News (1986–1991) (1994–2000) Production moved to TEN Sydney
 The Comedy Company (1988–1990) 
 The Early Bird Show (1985–1989) 
 The Henderson Kids (1985–1987)
 Holiday Island (1981)
1970s
 Good Morning Melbourne (1979–1988)
 Prisoner (1979–1986)
 The Early Bird Show (1977–1980, 1985–1989)
 The Box (1974–1977)
 The Price Is Right (1973–1974, 1989)
 Matlock Police (1971–1975)
 Young Talent Time (1971–1988)
1960s
 Fredd Bear's Breakfast-A-Go-Go (1969–1971)
 Magic Circle Club  (1964–1967)
 The Children's Show (1964)
 The Go!! Show
 The Ray Taylor Show
 This Is It
 Romper Room
 Katrina
 Noel and Mary
 Aweful Movie with Deadly Earnest (1967–1972)

Past productions on location around Melbourne
 2010 Commonwealth Games (2010) Docklands Studios Melbourne
 Mr & Mrs Murder (2013) Location
 Bikie Wars: Brothers in Arms (2012) Location
 Everybody Dance Now (TV series) (2012) Docklands Studios Melbourne
 Talkin' 'Bout Your Generation (2009–2012) Docklands Studios Melbourne
 Rush (2008–2011) Location
 Are You Smarter Than a 5th Grader? (2007–2009) Docklands Studios Melbourne
 The Wedge (2006–2007) Location
 Thank God You're Here (2006–2008) ATV10 Studios/Global Television Studios
 The Secret Life Of Us (2001–2005) St Kilda
 Rove  (2000–2009) ATV10 Studios/Global Television Studios
 Totally Full Frontal  moved from HSV7 (1998–1999)	ATV10 Studios/Location
 A Country Practice moved from ATN7 (1994) ATV10 Studios/Location

News and current affairs

10 News First is presented from ATV-10's Como Centre studios in South Yarra by Jennifer Keyte with sports presenter Stephen Quartermain and weather presenter Dr Adam Morgan.

ATV-0's first news presenter was its news director, Brian Wright, before Barry McQueen took over regular news presenting duties. The station's initial news format on weeknights was a 45-minute bulletin starting at 6:15pm, aimed at competing with the 30-minute bulletins offered by rival stations GTV-9 and HSV-7. The news format was changed a number of times, with the eventual adoption of the network's one-hour format in the early 1970s, and its take on the Eyewitness News format and brand in 1972, then presented by Geoff Raymond.

The flagship weeknight bulletin was formerly presented by David Johnston, who was replaced by Mal Walden following his move to HSV-7 in 1996. Co-presenter Jennifer Hansen, who with Walden formed one of the longest-serving news duos in Australian television history, was replaced by Helen Kapalos in 2006. Walden became sole anchor in December 2012 following the network's decision not to renew Kapalos' contract a month beforehand.

In February 2018, Brad McEwan announced his resignation from Network Ten to pursue other career opportunities. He finished with the network on Friday 27 April 2018.

Previous fill-in presenters included Brad McEwan and George Donikian.

Regular weekend bulletins from Melbourne were axed in the early 1990s in favour of a national bulletin from Sydney. However, localised editions of Ten Weekend News were reintroduced on Saturdays during the AFL season and presented by George Donikian, followed by a localised edition of Sports Tonight for Victoria. Permanent weekend bulletins were reintroduced in January 2011 (alongside a short-lived 6:30pm bulletin on weeknights) but discontinued ten months later.

As of September 2020, ATV-10 also oversees studio production of the Adelaide edition of 10 News First. Both bulletins are presented by Jennifer Keyte, combining local opt-outs for news, sport and weather with some shared content.

Presenters and reporters

News presenter
 Jennifer Keyte (2018–present)

Sports presenter
 Stephen Quartermain (2018–present)

Weather presenter
 Jayde Cotic (2023–present)

Fill-in presenters

 Candice Wyatt (News)
 Nick Butler (Sport)
 Caty Price (Sport)
 Rob Waters (Sport)

Reporters

 Candice Wyatt
 Emma O'Sullivan
 Simon Love (State political reporter)
 Yasmin Paton
 Nick Etchells
 Estelle Lewis
 Rob Waters (Sport)
 Caty Price (Sport)
 Nick Butler (Sport)
 Tim Morgan (Sport)
 Jade Robran (Sport)
 Tim Hipsley (Sport)
 Brett Thomas (Sport)

Former presenters
News

 Barry McQueen 
 Geoff Raymond
 Colin McEwan
 Ralphe Neill
 Bruce Mansfield (1974–1979)
 Annette Allison (1979)
 Michael Schildberger (1979)
 David Johnston (1980–1995)
 Jana Wendt (1980–1981)
 Jo Pearson (1982–1987, 1991–1993)
 Tracey Curro (1988–90)
 Marie-Louise Theile (1994–1995)
 Jennifer Hansen (1996–2005)
 Mal Walden (1996–2013)
 Helen Kapalos (2006–2012)
 Stephen Quartermain (2013–2018)

Sports

 Bruce McAvaney (1983–1989)
 Eddie McGuire (1986–1993)
 Nathan Templeton (2009–2012)
 Brad McEwan (1999–2003, 2013–2018)

Weather

 Briony Behets (1976)
 Christine Broadway
 Rob Gell (late 1970s – 1987)
 David Brown (1988–1994)
 Adam Digby
 Mike Larkan (1992–2020)
 Kate Freebairn (2020–2022)

See also
 Television broadcasting in Australia

References

Network 10
Television stations in Melbourne
Television channels and stations established in 1964